A kyai is an expert in Islam, usually used among the ethnic Javanese people.

Origins
The word is of Javanese origin. Sometimes it is spelled kiai. Traditionally, students of Islam in Indonesia would study in a boarding school known as a pesantren. The leader of the school was called kyai, as a form of respect. The traditional word for a teacher in Islam is ustad, which is a Persian word. There are many ustads in Indonesia who teach the religion, but most of them do not have a boarding school.

Education
Kiai were educated in various pesantren:

A student in a pesantren is called a santri. After the founding kyai of a pesantren dies, his son or another santri may take over the supervision of the school, and would then be called kyai. It is possible for a large boarding school to have several kyai living and teaching there. However, most pesantren have a few hundred students, with only one person who is called kyai. The other teachers in the school are called ustadz. Many Indonesian Muslims consider a kyai to be higher ranked than an ustadz because a kyai runs his own boarding school and has mystical abilities.

Function
Kiai were distinct from the pangulu, the state officials:

A kyai is not a cleric in the same way as a priest in Christianity or Buddhism. There is no governing body that ordains or authorizes a kyai. Likewise, no organization can defrock a kyai or remove him from his position. The reason is that a kyai has his position and authority because people will listen to what he says.

Some Indonesians refer to a widely regarded kyai as an ulama. This word is actually the plural form of the Arabic word alim which means knowledgeable person. Through common usage in Indonesia, the word ulama grew to signify a high-level kyai, even though this is a grammatical misuse of the Arabic word.

In legend, if not in fact, a kyai combines the skills and roles of both the Islamic scholar and the Sufi master (sheikh or syehk). Stories abound about kyai that can perform such feats as:
 Fly to Mecca for mid-day prayers and be back in the pesantren for the afternoon repast; 
 Walk through the rain without getting wet; 
 Meditate by the ocean until the waves stop moving; 
 Heal the sick; 
 Have secret knowledge about someone that can help that person solve personal problems.

Other uses

Heirloom items
Kyai is also a common honorific for important heirloom items in kratons in Java, like gamelan, chariot, and kris. For example, gamelan used in annual Grebeg celebration in Yogyakarta is called Kyai Sekati, itself divided into two instrumental sets: Kyai Gunturmadu and Kyai Nagawilaga. Meanwhile, Yogyakarta's royal chariot of is called Kyai Garudayaksa.

Wali Songo
In some parts of Indonesia, famous students of the Wali Songo mystics are referred to historically as kyai or kiai or ki. One of them, Ki Ageng Gribig, is said to have returned from Mecca with a small kind of pastry which did not spoil during the long journey. To commemorate this feat, the people of Jatinom hold a festival each year, wherein thousands of these little cakes (called apem) are blessed and tossed out to participants. The main road from Klaten to Boyolali in Central Java, which passes through the town of Jatinom, is officially named after Ki Ageng Gribig, though known colloquially as Jalan Boyolali (Boyolali Road).

References

Sources

 

Islamic schools
Islam in Indonesia
Islamic honorifics